The Joint United States Military Advisory Group, Thailand (JUSMAGTHAI) is the U.S. Department of Defense's Security Assistance Organization in Thailand. It was established on September 22nd, 1953. The Chief of JUSMAGTHAI also serves as the Senior Defense Official and Defense Attaché to Thailand. 

At the height of the Vietnam War, many American military specialists were assigned to JUSMAG-THAI in Bangkok.  As many as 45,000 US military personnel were stationed in Thailand. In the twenty-first century, JUSMAGTHAI supports a variety of missions including a Joint Combined bilateral Exercise Program which averages over 60 exercises a year, Foreign Military Sales and humanitarian demining missions. JUSMAGTHAI is located on a Royal Thai Armed Forces military compound approximately two kilometers from the American Embassy, on Sathorn Tai Road.

External links
http://www.jusmagthai.com

United States Security Assistance Organizations
Joint military units and formations of the United States
Thailand–United States military relations
Military advisory groups